Jenni Baird (born 29 April 1976) is an Australian actress. Baird was educated at the Western Australian Academy of Performing Arts from which she graduated in 1999. Upon graduation Baird appeared in the Australian short film I Promise. Baird has since appeared in several high-profile television series that have been broadcast nationwide in Australia with roles in All Saints, A Place to Call Home and The 4400, and in Australian movies Alien Trespass and Backtrack.

Following her debut role in I Promise Baird then appeared in several low key television roles and made her first prominent nationwide TV role on the long running multi award-winning drama series All Saints as Paula Morgan, making her first appearance in the episode "A Little Death" on 6 November 2001. Baird then made her final appearance in 2004 on 27 April. Whilst on the show Morgan's storylines included her being a nurse at the hospital where the show is based, getting engaged, being a single mother to her son Max and making the ultimate decision to move to New York. Following her stint on All Saints Baird appeared in Global Frequency, Amorality Tale and Conviction in 2005. In 2007 Baird made her first appearance in the American Mystery Drama series The 4400 as Meghan Doyle, appearing in the Season four episode "The Wrath of Graham". Her final appearance was at the end of the fourth season. In 2009 Baird appeared in the Australian comedy science fiction movie Alien Trespass in which she portrayed Tammy. The film received mixed reviews form critics but was praised for having a "warm tone". The movie added to the fame Baird gained from her appearances in "The 4400" and All Saints. In 2015 Baird appeared as Carol Bower in the Australian thriller/drama movie "Backtrack" written by Michael Petroni. It was subsequently praised for being "Masterful" by Filmink and was called "chilling" by Dread Central.

In 2013, Baird was cast in the period television drama A Place to Call Home. Prior to the airing of Baird's first appearance in the series Baird stated she was "worried" about fans' reaction to the extreme character she portrays. Baird made her first appearance in the episode "Cane Toad", and appeared throughout the rest of season one of the series. The episode was subsequently awarded an Australian Cinematographers Society award in the category of Telefeatures, TV Drama & Mini Series Award of Distinction. When the series was renewed for a second season following successful ratings Baird returned as a recurring character and reprised her role. When the show was renewed for a third season Baird returned as a main character. In 2014 Baird shared with the rest of the cast of A Place to Call Home the nomination for Most Outstanding Drama Series at the Logie Awards of 2014. The show was also nominated for the award in the category Most Outstanding Performance by an Ensemble in a Drama Series at the 2014 Equity Ensemble Awards Ceremony. In 2015 Baird appeared on the TV Week list of The Top 10 Aussie Villains. The third series premiered in 2015, and following the end of the broadcast it was renewed for a fourth season set to air in 2016. Discussing the fourth season Baird stated that the audience "ain't seen nothing yet", saying the series was darker than ever before. At the Logie Awards of 2016 Baird was nominated for the award Most Outstanding Supporting Actress for her appearance in A Place to Call Home. This nomination was her first TV Logie nomination as an actress that had not been shared with rest of the cast of A Place To Call Home. In 2016 Baird appeared on the cover of the Australian newspaper The Guide in an article titled "How costumes complete A Place To Call Home". Before the end of the airing of the fourth season of A Place to Call Home was confirmed by Marta Düsseldorp to have been renewed for a fifth series which aired in 2017.

Baird has publicly stated that she supported Hillary Clinton in the United States presidential election of 2016.

Early career 

Baird attended the Western Australian Academy of Performing Arts, graduating in 1999. She then participated in the 1999 edition of the ANPC/Stages Young Playwrights Weekend.

Career

1999 - 2004: Debuting on Australia's Movie Screens and finding fame 
Following Baird's graduation from Western Australian Academy of Performing Art in 1999 Baird made her debut in the film industry in the Australian short film I Promise. In the year 2000 Baird appeared in the movie Metropolis in which she starred as Charlotte. The following year Baird appeared in the TV Movie Crash Palace appearing as Chris Stanford. Despite these appearances Baird first found fame when she was cast in the long running and multi award-winning soap hospital drama All Saints, appearing as Paula Morgan. Baird first appeared on the show in November 2001, and made her final appearance in April 2004 when her character decides to move to New York City to pursue new adventures. Upon first appearing on the show Baird was described as a "new star". Whilst on the show Baird was considered a main character and appeared in over fifty episodes by the end of her stint on the show. When the show ended Baird appeared prominently in the "Final Farewell Trailer" which featured memories from across the entire show. In 2004 Baird left the cast of All Saints after three years as a main character making her final appearance in the episode "Bad Pennies" on 27 April. Also in 2001 Baird appeared in the Australian soap drama Crash Palace as Chris Sanford.

2005 - 2006: Debuting on America 's Screen
In 2005 Baird appeared in the Australian short film Amorality Tale which featured Her as the protagonist character of Roz. Later in the same year she made her debut on American small screens in the TV Movie Global Frequency in which she starred as Dr. Katrina Finch. The film was originally a pilot episode, but as the decision was made not to produce a series the episode was treated as a television movie. Alongside these appearances Baird also appeared in the television drama movie Conviction. In 2006 she appeared was a guest star in the police mystery drama Justice as Linda Wallis in the episode "The Wrongful Death" which aired on 27 September 2006.

2007: Further American Recognition
In 2007 Baird appeared in the Australian short film Love Is Love as Sabrina. Later the same year she was confirmed to have been cast in a main role in the fourth season of the Primetime Emmy-nominated American TV show The 4400. Baird subsequently appeared in her first episode on 17 June 2007 as Meghan Doyle. In the fourth season of the show, Baird became a main character, and in an interview with TV Guide she expressed her opinion that Doyle was "quite different from everybody else". Following the end of the broadcast of season 4 the show was unexpectedly cancelled. This caused shock and outrage among fans, but a petition with 70,000 signatures was ineffective in having the show return to air.

2009: Returning to Acting
In 2009 after a year's break Baird returned in the Australian science fiction drama movie Alien Trespass as Tammy. The film gained mixed reviews following its release with some calling the movie "cheesy; however, some critics praised the film. For example, in the Boston.com review critic Ty Burr dubbed it "pretty endearing" and also said the movie had "more simple joy to be found here than in all of DreamWorks' 3-D extravaganza". Entertainment Weekly gave the movie a fairly positive review giving it a "B+" grade. The magazine described Baird's character Tammy was as someone who "thinks on her feet". As a member of the main cast Baird appeared at WonderCon in 2009 to talk about the film.

2012 - 2016: Success with A Place To Call Home and Acting
In 2012 Baird appeared as guest star in the American television series GCB as Mikki. In 2013 she was cast in Bevan Lee's Australian television drama A Place to Call Home as Regina Standish. Baird was originally told her character would be a guest star in the show. She made her first appearance in the episode "Cane Toad" which was awarded an Australian Cinematographers Society Telefeatures, TV Drama & Mini Series Award of Distinction. She subsequently appeared in five episodes in season one. Baird returned in the second season as a recurring character. In 2014 the show earned three Logie Awards and an Equity Ensemble Awards's nomination. Following the second season A Place To Call Home was cancelled by the show's broadcaster Seven Network. Later Foxtel finalized a deal that allowed for a third season to be produced and aired on Foxtel. It premiered in 2015 with Baird returning to the show as a main character. The show was subsequently renewed for a fourth season set for release the following year. During 2015 Baird starred in the Australian thriller/ mystery drama film Backtrack in which she appeared as Carol Bower. In a review by website flickering myth.com the film was described as having "an overall atmosphere of dread". In 2016 her portrayal of Regina Standish in A Place To Call Home earned Baird a Silver TV Logie Award nomination in the category of Most Outstanding Supporting Actress. Prior to the release of the fourth season of A Place To Call Home Baird stated that the drama would be "darker than ever" and that the series is set to be "explosive". She also said that she was "excited" for the series to return to the small screen. The fourth season premiered in September 2016.[10] Before the end of the series' the fourth season the show was renewed for a fifth series set to begin filming in February 2017. In 2017, the fifth series of A Place to Call Home aired. On the season finale of the series Baird stated that she believed it would be "startling" for fans. Alongside working on A Place To Call Home Baird appeared on an episode of Doctor Doctor as Hilda.

Filmography

Film

Television

Notes

External links 

 

1976 births
20th-century Australian actresses
21st-century Australian actresses
Australian television actresses
Living people